Jacob Smith Jarmann (30 May 1816 – 29 March 1894) was a Norwegian firearms designer and inventor of the Jarmann rifle.

Biography
Jarmann was born in the parish of Nord-Fron in Oppland,  Norway. He was raised at the farm Øien in the traditional district of Gudbrandsdalen. 
He developed an interest in firearms at an early age, and he designed his first rifle—a breech loading rifle firing cardboard cartridges—in 1838, but this was turned down by the armed forces at the time. The logic was that a rifle capable of firing 13 shots a minute would be impossible to supply with enough ammunition.

In the 1870s he stepped down from the daily running of his workshop to develop his newly invented bolt action rifle.  This rifle, the Jarmann, was adopted by the Norwegian Army in 1884. The weapon was produced at the Kongsberg Weapon Factory (Kongsberg Våpenfabrikk).

Jarmann  was appointed a Knight of the Order of St. Olav  and made a member of the Order of Vasa. He died in 1894, the same year his rifle was phased out of the service and replaced with the Krag–Jørgensen. After the Jarmann rifle was phased out of military use, some of the weapons were converted for use as the Jarmann harpoon rifle.

References

Other sources
Hanevik, Karl Egil  (1998) Norske militærgeværer etter 1867 (Hanevik våpen) 
Hanevik, Karl Egil  Kongsberg-Colten (Hanevik våpen)

Related reading
Flatnes, Oyvind (2014)  From Musket to Metallic Cartridge (Crowood Press)

External links
The Jarmann rifle - Part 1 - Background history
The Jarmann rifle - Part 2 - Shooting

1816 births
1894 deaths
People from Nord-Fron
Firearm designers
Norwegian designers
Norwegian inventors
Recipients of the Order of Vasa
Recipients of the St. Olav's Medal